The history of Mumbai during the 21st century covers the Indian city of Mumbai in the 21st century, during which the city suffered several terrorist attacks.

Timeline

2001 – 2009
2002 bombing
On 2 December 2002, a bomb placed under a seat of an empty BEST (Brihanmumbai Electric Supply and Transport) bus exploded near Ghatkopar station in Mumbai. Around 2 people were killed and 50 were injured. The bombing occurred on the tenth anniversary of the demolition of the Babri Mosque in Ayodhya.

2003 bombings
On 27 January 2003, a bomb placed on a bicycle exploded near the Vile Parle station in Mumbai. The bomb killed 1 and injured 25. The blast occurred a day ahead of the visit of Atal Bihari Vajpayee, the then Prime Minister of India to the city.
On 13 March 2003, a bomb exploded in a train compartment, as the train was entering the Mulund station in Mumbai. 10 people were killed and 70 were injured. The blast occurred a day after the tenth anniversary of the 1993 Bombay bombings.
On 28 July 2003, a bomb placed under a seat of a BEST bus exploded in Ghatkopar. The bomb killed 4 people and injured 32.
On 25 August 2003, two blasts in South Mumbai – one near the Gateway of India and the other at Zaveri Bazaar in Kalbadevi occurred. At least 44 people were killed and 150 injured. No group claimed responsibility for the attack, but it had been hinted that the Pakistan-based Lashkar-e-Toiba was behind the attacks.

2005 floods
Mumbai was lashed by torrential rains on 26–27 July 2005, during which the city was brought to a complete standstill. The city received 37 inches (940 millimeters) of rain in 24 hours — the most any Indian city has ever received in a single day. Around 83 people were killed.

2006 bombings
On 11 July 2006, a series of seven bomb blasts took place over a period of 11 minutes on the Suburban Railway in Mumbai at Khar, Mahim, Matunga, Jogeshwari, Borivali, and one between Khar and Santa Cruz. 209 people were killed and over 700 were injured. According to Mumbai Police, the bombings were carried out by Lashkar-e-Toiba and Students Islamic Movement of India (SIMI).

2008 attacks against migrants and bombings
In 2008, the city experienced xenophobic attacks by the activists of the Maharashtra Navnirman Sena (MNS) under Raj Thackeray on the North Indian migrants in Mumbai. Attacks included assault on North Indian taxi drivers and damage of their vehicles.
There were a series of ten coordinated terrorist attacks by 10 armed Pakistani men using automatic weapons and grenades which began on 26 November 2008 and ended on 29 November 2008. The attacks resulted in 164 deaths, 308 injuries, and severe damage to several important buildings.

Bandra-Worli sea link
The Bandra–Worli Sea Link, officially known as Rajiv Gandhi Sea Link was opened to the general public on 30 June 2009. Four lanes was opened in the early stage, while all eight lanes were opened to traffic in March 2010.

2010s

Barack Obama visit
US President Barack Obama visited Mumbai, India, between 6–9 November 2010. The President commemorated the 26/11 attacks on the city, visited the Mani Bhavan Museum, and hosted various business activities at the Oberoi Trident. The President later hosted a town hall meeting at St Xavier's College. During his stay in Mumbai, the President stayed at the Taj Mahal Palace & Tower, which had previously been a terrorist target in the 2008 attacks. The President proceeded to New Delhi, where he addressed the joint session of the Indian Parliament.

2011 Cricket World Cup
On 2 April 2011, the 2011 Cricket World Cup final was held at the Wankhede Stadium, where, India emerged as a champion for the second time after the 1983 Cricket World Cup.

2011 bombings
The city again saw a series of three coordinated bomb explosions at different locations on 13 July 2011 between 18:54 and 19:06 IST. The blasts occurred at the Opera House, Zaveri Bazaar, and Dadar, which left 26 killed, and 130 injured.

2020s
26 March - 2021 Mumbai hospital fire
18 July - 2021 Mumbai landslide

References

 
Mumbai-related lists